Sibusiso Vilakazi (born 29 December 1989) is a South African soccer player who plays as an attacking midfielder for TS Galaxy in the Premier Soccer League. In the 2013–14 Premier Soccer League season, he won the player of the season and players' player of the season awards. He also won the Nedbank Cup player of the tournament during that season.

International career 
Vilakazi made his international debut for South Africa on 12 October 2013 in a 1–1 draw against Morocco at the Adrar Stadium.

Honours

Mamelodi Sundowns 
Premier Soccer League: 2017–18; 2018-19; 2019-20; 2020-21; 2021-22

International goals
Scores and results list South Africa's goal tally first.

References

1989 births
Living people
Sportspeople from Soweto
Zulu people
South African soccer players
Association football midfielders
Bidvest Wits F.C. players
Mamelodi Sundowns F.C. players
TS Galaxy F.C. players
South Africa international soccer players
2015 Africa Cup of Nations players
2019 Africa Cup of Nations players
South Africa A' international soccer players
2014 African Nations Championship players